Lanark is the county town of Lanarkshire, Scotland.

Lanark may also refer to:

Places

United States
Lanark, Illinois, a city
Lanark, New Mexico, a ghost town
Lanark, Pennsylvania, an unincorporated village
Lanark, Texas, an unincorporated community
Lanark, West Virginia, an unincorporated community
Lanark, Wisconsin, a town
Lanark Reef, Florida, in the Gulf of Mexico

Elsewhere
Lanark County, Western Australia, a former county
Lanark, Ontario, Canada, an unincorporated community and former village
Lanark County, Ontario
Clydesdale (district) or Lanark, a former local government district in the Strathclyde region of Scotland
Lanark Loch, a man-made loch in Lanark, Scotland

Electoral constituencies
Lanark (electoral district), Ontario, Canada
Lanark (Parliament of Scotland constituency), disestablished in 1707
Lanark (UK Parliament constituency)

Other uses
HMCS Lanark (K669), a Royal Canadian Navy frigate that served in the Second World War
Lanark: A Life in Four Books, a novel by Alasdair Gray

See also
Lanark Village, Florida, US, an unincorporated community
New Lanark, a village on the River Clyde in Scotland
Adam de Lanark (died 1378), Scottish Dominican friar and prelate